Burke County is a county on the north edge of the U.S. state of North Dakota, adjacent to the south line of Canada. As of the 2020 census, the population was 2,201. The county seat is Bowbells. The county is named after John Burke, the tenth Governor of North Dakota.

History
A vote was held on November 3, 1908, in which county voters authorized the partition of Burke County from what was then known as 'Imperial Ward County' (which consisted of what is now Burke, Mountrail, Renville, and Ward counties). Its name recognized the state governor at the time, John Burke. However, the vote was challenged in court, and appealed to the state supreme court. That court ruled on June 3, 1910, to uphold the election results, so on July 12, Governor Burke issued a proclamation creating Burke County. Its organization was effected on July 15, with Bowbells as its county seat. The county is managed by a three-member Board of Commissioners. As of 2018 the Board Chair is Debbie Kuryn.

Geography
Burke County lies on the north line of North Dakota. Its north boundary line abuts the south boundary line of Canada. The Des Lacs River flows south-southeasterly through the east part of the county, and the White Earth River flows northeasterly through the lower part. The county terrain consists of semi-arid low hills in the northeast part of the county, with higher carved and eroded ridges on the southwestern portion of the county. The area is partly used for agriculture. The terrain slopes to the north; its highest point is on the lower west boundary line, at 2,461' (750m) ASL.

Major highways

  U.S. Highway 52
  North Dakota Highway 5
  North Dakota Highway 8
  North Dakota Highway 40
  North Dakota Highway 50

Adjacent counties and rural municipalities

 Estevan No. 5, Saskatchewan – north
 Coalfields No. 4, Saskatchewan – north
 Enniskillen No. 3, Saskatchewan – north
 Renville County – east
 Ward County – southeast
 Mountrail County – south
 Williams County – southwest
 Divide County – west

Protected areas
 Des Lacs National Wildlife Refuge (part)
 Lostwood National Wildlife Refuge (part)

Lakes

 Beaver Lake
 Enget Lake
 Iverson Slough
 Powers Lake (part)
 Shallow Lake
 Swensons Slouth
 Teal Slough
 Thompson Slough
 Upper Thompson Lake

Demographics

2000 census
As of the 2000 census, there were 2,242 people, 1,013 households, and 680 families in the county. The population density was 2.0 people per square mile (0.8/km2). There were 1,412 housing units at an average density of 1.3 per square mile (0.5/km2). The racial makeup of the county was 99.24% White, 0.13% Black or African American, 0.22% Native American, 0.13% Asian, 0.04% from other races, and 0.22% from two or more races. 0.36% of the population were Hispanic or Latino of any race. 52.4% were of Norwegian, 18.4% German and 7.4% Swedish ancestry.

There were 1,013 households, out of which 23.00% had children under the age of 18 living with them, 58.20% were married couples living together, 5.30% had a female householder with no husband present, and 32.80% were non-families. 31.60% of all households were made up of individuals, and 17.60% had someone living alone who was 65 years of age or older. The average household size was 2.21 and the average family size was 2.77.

The county population contained 20.80% under the age of 18, 3.50% from 18 to 24, 22.30% from 25 to 44, 28.30% from 45 to 64, and 25.10% who were 65 years of age or older. The median age was 48 years. For every 100 females there were 101.60 males. For every 100 females age 18 and over, there were 103.80 males.

The median income for a household in the county was $25,330, and the median income for a family was $31,384. Males had a median income of $28,164 versus $16,382 for females. The per capita income for the county was $14,026. About 11.70% of families and 15.40% of the population were below the poverty line, including 17.20% of those under age 18 and 16.50% of those age 65 or over.

2010 census
As of the 2010 census, there were 1,968 people, 913 households, and 567 families in the county. The racial makeup of the county was 97.8% white, 0.8% American Indian, 0.7% Asian, 0.2% black or African American, 0.0% from other races, and 0.6% from two or more races. Those of Hispanic or Latino origin made up 1.9% of the population. In terms of ancestry, 45.2% were of Norwegian, 34.9% German, 13% Swedish, and 10% Danish ancestry.

Of the 913 households, 22.6% had children under the age of 18 living with them, 52.4% were married couples living together, 5.4% had a female householder with no husband present, 37.9% were non-families, and 33.6% of all households were made up of individuals. The average household size was 2.15 and the average family size was 2.74. The median age was 48.1 years.

The median income for a household in the county was $50,800 and the median income for a family was $62,283. Males had a median income of $49,958 versus $27,206 for females. The per capita income for the county was $32,347. About 3.3% of families and 5.8% of the population were below the poverty line, including 9.4% of those under age 18 and 6.1% of those age 65 or over.

Economy
The main industries in Burke County are farming and oil extraction. Burke County is one of several western North Dakota counties with significant exposure to the Bakken Formation in the Williston Basin.

Communities

Cities

 Bowbells (county seat)
 Columbus
 Flaxton
 Lignite
 Portal
 Powers Lake

Census-designated place
 Larson

Unincorporated communities

 Atcoal
 Battleview
 Coteau
 Kincaid
 Northgate
 Perella
 Rival
 Stampede
 Woburn

Townships

 Battleview
 Bowbells
 Carter
 Clayton
 Cleary
 Colville
 Dale
 Dimond
 Fay
 Foothills
 Forthun
 Garness
 Harmonious
 Kandiyohi
 Keller
 Lakeview
 Leaf Mountain
 Lucy
 Minnesota
 North Star
 Portal
 Richland
 Roseland
 Short Creek
 Soo
 Thorson
 Vale
 Vanville
 Ward

Politics
Burke County voters have been reliably Republican for several decades. In no national election since 1964 has the county selected the Democratic Party candidate (as of 2020). In 1912, it was one of only four counties nationwide to vote for Socialist nominee Eugene Debs.

See also
 National Register of Historic Places listings in Burke County, North Dakota

References

 
1910 establishments in North Dakota
Populated places established in 1910